The Madeiran wood pigeon (Columba palumbus maderensis) was a subspecies of the wood pigeon (Columba palumbus) endemic to Madeira (Portugal), and found in the island's laurel forest habitat.

The Madeiran wood pigeon closely resembled the wood pigeon of mainland Europe, but the plumage was somewhat darker, especially on the upperparts and under wing-coverts. The vinous-pink of the breast was more extensive.

The German ornithologist Ernst Schmitz lived on the island of Madeira by 1896–1906, a time when the Madeiran wood pigeon was already rare. Despite great efforts, Schmitz managed to collect only a few specimens and eggs. In May 1924, no Madeiran wood pigeon was found, nor was any seen in later years, not even by local pigeon hunters. This subspecies is most likely extinct now.

See also 
 List of extinct birds
 List of extinct animals
 List of extinct animals of Europe

References

External links 
 The Sixth Extinction Website
 Extinction: Madeiran Wood Pigeon UWSP GEOG358 (Heywood)

Columba (genus)
Extinct birds of Atlantic islands
Bird extinctions since 1500
Birds of Madeira
Endemic fauna of Madeira
Birds described in 1904